Kati Ojaloo (born 31 January 1990) is an Estonian hammer thrower. She participated at the 2014 European Athletics Championships.

Her personal best in the event is 71.50 metres set in Pori, Finland in August 2020, it is also the Estonian national record.

She lives in Finland and is in a relationship with Finnish hammer thrower Tuomas Seppänen. She earned the right to compete in Finnish Championship events since February 2019.

Competition record

References

External links 
 Kati Ojaloo's Profile on All-Athletics.com

1990 births
Living people
Estonian female hammer throwers
Competitors at the 2015 Summer Universiade
Estonian expatriate sportspeople in Finland